Astor is a ghost town in Greeley County, Kansas, United States.

History
The post office in Astor closed in 1896.

References

Further reading

External links
 Greeley County maps: Current, Historic, KDOT

Ghost towns in Kansas